Helen of Troy, Helen, Helena, also known as beautiful Helen, Helen of Argos, or Helen of Sparta, was a figure in Greek mythology said to have been the most beautiful woman in the world. She was believed to have been the daughter of Zeus and Leda, and was the sister of Clytemnestra, Castor and Pollux, Philonoe, Phoebe and Timandra. She was married to King Menelaus of Sparta "who became by her the father of Hermione, and, according to others, of Nicostratus also." Her abduction by Paris of Troy was the most immediate cause of the Trojan War.

Elements of her putative biography come from classical authors such as Aristophanes, Cicero, Euripides, and Homer (in both the Iliad and the Odyssey). Her story reappears in Book II of Virgil's Aeneid. In her youth, she was abducted by Theseus. A competition between her suitors for her hand in marriage saw Menelaus emerge victorious. All of her suitors were required to swear an oath (known as the Oath of Tyndareus) promising to provide military assistance to the winning suitor, if Helen were ever stolen from him. The obligations of the oath precipitated the Trojan War. When she married Menelaus she was still very young; whether her subsequent departure with Paris was an abduction or an elopement is ambiguous (probably deliberately so).

The legends of Helen during her time in Troy are contradictory: Homer depicts her ambivalently, both regretful of her choice and sly in her attempts to redeem her public image. Other accounts have a treacherous Helen who simulated Bacchic rites and rejoiced in the carnage she caused. In some versions, Helen doesn't arrive in Troy, but instead waits out the war in Egypt. Ultimately, Paris was killed in action, and in Homer's account Helen was reunited with Menelaus, though other versions of the legend recount her ascending to Olympus instead. A cult associated with her developed in Hellenistic Laconia, both at Sparta and elsewhere; at Therapne she shared a shrine with Menelaus. She was also worshiped in Attica and on Rhodes.

Her beauty inspired artists of all times to represent her, frequently as the personification of ideal human beauty. Images of Helen start appearing in the 7th century BC. In classical Greece, her abduction by Paris—or escape with him—was a popular motif. In medieval illustrations, this event was frequently portrayed as a seduction, whereas in Renaissance paintings it was usually depicted as a "rape" (i. e. abduction) by Paris. Christopher Marlowe's lines from his tragedy Doctor Faustus (1604) are frequently cited: "Was this the face that launched a thousand ships / And burnt the topless towers of Ilium?"

Etymology 

The etymology of Helen's name continues to be a problem for scholars. In the 1800's, Georg Curtius related Helen to the moon (Selene). But two early dedications to Helen in the Laconian dialect of ancient Greek spell her name with an initial digamma (probably pronounced like a w), which rules out any etymology originally starting with simple *s-. 

In the early 1900's, Émile Boisacq considered Ἑλένη to derive from the well-known noun  meaning "torch". It has also been suggested that the λ of  arose from an original ν, and thus the etymology of the name would be connected with the root of Venus. Linda Lee Clader, however, says that none of the above suggestions offers much satisfaction.

More recently, Otto Skutsch has advanced the theory that the name Helen might have two separate etymologies, which belong to different mythological figures respectively, namely *Sṷelenā (related to Sanskrit svaraṇā "the shining one") and *Selenā, the first a Spartan goddess, connected to one or the other natural light phenomenon (especially St. Elmo's fire) and sister of the Dioscuri, the other a vegetation goddess worshiped in Therapne as Ἑλένα Δενδρῖτις ("Helena of the Trees"). 

Others have connected the name's etymology to a hypothetical Proto-Indo-European sun goddess, noting the name's connection to the word for "sun" in various Indo-European cultures including the Greek proper word and god for the sun, Helios. In particular, her marriage myth may be connected to a broader Indo-European "marriage drama" of the sun goddess, and she is related to the divine twins, just as many of these goddesses are.  Martin L. West has thus proposed that Helena ("mistress of sunlight") may be constructed on the PIE suffix -nā ("mistress of"), connoting a deity controlling a natural element.

None of the etymological sources appear to support the existence of a definitive connection between the name of Helen, the Norse goddess Hel, the Christian Hell and the name by which the classical Greeks commonly described themselves, namely Hellenes, after Hellen the mythological progenitor of the Greeks.

Prehistoric and mythological context 

The origins of Helen's myth probably date back at least to the Mycenaean age. Her name first appears in the poems of Homer but scholars assume that such myths derive from earlier Mycenaean Greek sources. Her mythological birthplace was Sparta of the Age of Heroes, which features prominently in the canon of Greek myth: in later ancient Greek memory, the Mycenaean Bronze Age became the age of the Greek heroes. The kings, queens, and heroes of the Trojan Cycle are often related to the gods, since divine origins gave stature to the Greeks' heroic ancestors. The fall of Troy came to represent a fall from an illustrious heroic age, remembered for centuries in oral tradition before being written down. Recent archaeological excavations in Greece suggest that modern-day Laconia was a distinct territory in the Late Bronze Age, while the poets narrate that it was a rich kingdom. Archaeologists have unsuccessfully looked for a Mycenaean palatial complex buried beneath present-day Sparta. Modern findings suggest the area around Menelaion in the southern part of the Eurotas valley seems to have been the center of Mycenaean Laconia.

Family 
Helen and Paris had three sons, Bunomus, Aganus ("gentle"), Idaeus and a daughter also called Helen.

Mythology

Birth 

In most sources, including the Iliad and the Odyssey, Helen is the daughter of Zeus and of Leda, the wife of the Spartan king Tyndareus. Euripides' play Helen, written in the late 5th century BC, is the earliest source to report the most familiar account of Helen's birth: that, although her putative father was Tyndareus, she was actually Zeus' daughter. In the form of a swan, the king of gods was chased by an eagle, and sought refuge with Leda. The swan gained her affection, and the two mated. Leda then produced an egg, from which Helen emerged. The First Vatican Mythographer introduces the notion that two eggs came from the union: one containing Castor and Pollux; one with Helen and Clytemnestra. Nevertheless, the same author earlier states that Helen, Castor and Pollux were produced from a single egg. Fabius Planciades Fulgentius also states that Helen, Castor and Pollux are born from the same egg.  Pseudo-Apollodorus states that Leda had intercourse with both Zeus and Tyndareus the night she conceived Helen.

On the other hand, in the Cypria, part of the Epic Cycle, Helen was the daughter of Zeus and the goddess Nemesis. The date of the Cypria is uncertain, but it is generally thought to preserve traditions that date back to at least the 7th century BC. In the Cypria, Nemesis did not wish to mate with Zeus. She therefore changed shape into various animals as she attempted to flee Zeus, finally becoming a goose. Zeus also transformed himself into a goose and raped Nemesis, who produced an egg from which Helen was born. Presumably, in the Cypria, this egg was somehow transferred to Leda. Later sources state either that it was brought to Leda by a shepherd who discovered it in a grove in Attica, or that it was dropped into her lap by Hermes.

Asclepiades of Tragilos and Pseudo-Eratosthenes related a similar story, except that Zeus and Nemesis became swans instead of geese. Timothy Gantz has suggested that the tradition that Zeus came to Leda in the form of a swan derives from the version in which Zeus and Nemesis transformed into birds.

Pausanias states that in the middle of the 2nd century AD, the remains of an egg-shell, tied up in ribbons, were still suspended from the roof of a temple on the Spartan acropolis. People believed that this was "the famous egg that legend says Leda brought forth". Pausanias traveled to Sparta to visit the sanctuary, dedicated to Hilaeira and Phoebe, in order to see the relic for himself.

Pausanias also says that there was a local tradition that Helen's brothers, "the Dioscuri" (i.e. Castor and Pollux), were born on the island of Pefnos, adding that the Spartan poet Alcman also said this, while the poet Lycophron's use of the adjective "Pephnaian" (Πεφναίας) in association with Helen, suggests that Lycophron may have known a tradition which held that Helen was also born on the island.

Youthful abduction by Theseus 

Two Athenians, Theseus and Pirithous, thought that since they were sons of gods, they should have divine wives; they thus pledged to help each other abduct two daughters of Zeus. Theseus chose Helen, and Pirithous vowed to marry Persephone, the wife of Hades. Theseus took Helen and left her with his mother Aethra or his associate Aphidnus at Aphidnae or Athens. Theseus and Pirithous then traveled to the underworld, the domain of Hades, to kidnap Persephone. Hades pretended to offer them hospitality and set a feast, but, as soon as the pair sat down, snakes coiled around their feet and held them there. Helen's abduction caused an invasion of Athens by Castor and Pollux, who captured Aethra in revenge, and returned their sister to Sparta.  In Goethe's Faust, Centaur Chiron is said to have aided the Dioscuri brothers in returning Helen home.

In most accounts of this event, Helen was quite young; Hellanicus of Lesbos said she was seven years old and Diodorus makes her ten years old. On the other hand, Stesichorus said that Iphigenia was the daughter of Theseus and Helen, which obviously implies that Helen was of childbearing age. In most sources, Iphigenia is the daughter of Agamemnon and Clytemnestra, but Duris of Samos and other writers followed Stesichorus' account.

Ovid's Heroides give us an idea of how ancient and, in particular, Roman authors imagined Helen in her youth: she is presented as a young princess wrestling naked in the palaestra, alluding to a part of girls' physical education in classical (not Mycenaean) Sparta. Sextus Propertius imagines Helen as a girl who practices arms and hunts with her brothers:

Suitors 

When it was time for Helen to marry, many kings and princes from around the world came to seek her hand, bringing rich gifts with them or sent emissaries to do so on their behalf. During the contest, Castor and Pollux had a prominent role in dealing with the suitors, although the final decision was in the hands of Tyndareus. Menelaus, her future husband, did not attend but sent his brother, Agamemnon, to represent him.

Oath of Tyndareus 
Tyndareus was afraid to select a husband for his daughter, or send any of the suitors away, for fear of offending them and giving grounds for a quarrel. Odysseus was one of the suitors, but had brought no gifts because he believed he had little chance to win the contest. He thus promised to solve the problem, if Tyndareus in turn would support him in his courting of Penelope, the daughter of Icarius. Tyndareus readily agreed, and Odysseus proposed that, before the decision was made, all the suitors should swear a most solemn oath to defend the chosen husband against whoever should quarrel with him. After the suitors had sworn not to retaliate, Menelaus was chosen to be Helen's husband. As a sign of the importance of the pact, Tyndareus sacrificed a horse. Helen and Menelaus became rulers of Sparta, after Tyndareus and Leda abdicated. Menelaus and Helen rule in Sparta for at least ten years; they have a daughter, Hermione, and (according to some myths) three sons: Aethiolas, Maraphius, and Pleisthenes.

The marriage of Helen and Menelaus marks the beginning of the end of the age of heroes. Concluding the catalog of Helen's suitors, Hesiod reports Zeus' plan to obliterate the race of men and the heroes in particular. The Trojan War, caused by Helen's elopement with Paris, is going to be his means to this end.

Seduction or kidnapping by Paris 

Paris, a Trojan prince, came to Sparta to claim Helen, in the guise of a supposed diplomatic mission. Before this journey, Paris had been appointed by Zeus to judge the most beautiful goddess; Hera, Athena, or Aphrodite. In order to earn his favour, Aphrodite promised Paris the most beautiful woman in the world. Swayed by Aphrodite's offer, Paris chose her as the most beautiful of the goddesses, earning the wrath of Athena and Hera.

Although Helen is sometimes depicted as being raped by Paris, Ancient Greek sources are often elliptical and contradictory. Herodotus states that Helen was abducted, but the Cypria simply mentions that after giving Helen gifts, "Aphrodite brings the Spartan queen together with the Prince of Troy." Sappho argues that Helen willingly left behind Menelaus and their nine-year-old daughter, Hermione, to be with Paris:

Dio Chrysostom gives a completely different account of the story, questioning Homer's credibility: after Agamemnon had married Helen's sister, Clytemnestra, Tyndareus sought Helen's hand for Menelaus for political reasons. However, Helen was sought by many suitors, who came from far and near, among them Paris who surpassed all the others and won the favor of Tyndareus and his sons. Thus he won her fairly and took her away to Troia, with the full consent of her natural protectors. Cypria narrate that in just three days Paris and Helen reached Troy. Homer narrates that during a brief stop-over in the small island of Kranai, according to Iliad, the two lovers consummated their passion. On the other hand, Cypria note that this happened the night before they left Sparta.

In Egypt 
At least three Ancient Greek authors denied that Helen ever went to Troy; instead, they suggested, Helen stayed in Egypt during the duration of the Trojan War. Those three authors are Euripides, Stesichorus, and Herodotus. In the version put forth by Euripides in his play Helen, Hera fashioned a likeness of Helen (eidolon, εἴδωλον)  out of clouds at Zeus' request, Hermes took her to Egypt, and Helen never went to Troy instead spending the entire war in Egypt. Eidolon is also present in Stesichorus' account, but not in Herodotus' rationalizing version of the myth. In addition to these accounts, Lycophron 822 states that Hesiod was the first to mention Helen's eidolon. This statement may mean Hesiod stated this in a literary work or that the idea was widely known/circulated in early archaic Greece during the time of Hesiod and was consequently attributed to him.

Herodotus adds weight to the "Egyptian" version of events by putting forward his own evidence—he traveled to Egypt and interviewed the priests of the temple (Foreign Aphrodite, ξείνη Ἀφροδίτη) at Memphis.  According to these priests, Helen had arrived in Egypt shortly after leaving Sparta, because strong winds had blown Paris's ship off course.  King Proteus of Egypt, appalled that Paris had seduced his host's wife and plundered his host's home in Sparta, disallowed Paris from taking Helen to Troy.  Paris returned to Troy without a new bride, but the Greeks refused to believe that Helen was in Egypt and not within Troy's walls. Thus, Helen waited in Memphis for ten years, while the Greeks and the Trojans fought. Following the conclusion of the Trojan War, Menelaus sailed to Memphis, where Proteus reunited him with Helen.

In Troy 
When he discovered that his wife was missing, Menelaus called upon all the other suitors to fulfill their oaths, thus beginning the Trojan War.

The Greek fleet gathered in Aulis, but the ships could not sail for lack of wind. Artemis was enraged by a sacrilege, and only the sacrifice of Agamemnon's daughter, Iphigenia, could appease her. In Euripides Iphigenia in Aulis, Clytemnestra, Iphigenia's mother and Helen's sister, begs her husband to reconsider his decision, calling Helen a "wicked woman". Clytemnestra tries to warn Agamemnon that sacrificing Iphigenia for Helen's sake is, "buying what we most detest with what we hold most dear".

Before the opening of hostilities, the Greeks dispatched a delegation to the Trojans under Odysseus and Menelaus; they endeavored without success to persuade Priam to hand Helen back. A popular theme, The Request of Helen (Helenes Apaitesis, Ἑλένης Ἀπαίτησις), was the subject of a drama by Sophocles, now lost.

Homer paints a poignant, lonely picture of Helen in Troy. She is filled with self-loathing and regret for what she has caused; by the end of the war, the Trojans have come to hate her. When Hector dies, she is the third mourner at his funeral, and she says that, of all the Trojans, Hector and Priam alone were always kind to her:

These bitter words reveal that Helen gradually realized Paris' weaknesses, and decided to ally herself with Hector. There is an affectionate relationship between the two, and Helen has harsh words for Paris when she compares the two brothers:

After Paris was killed in combat, there was some dispute among the Trojans about which of Priam's surviving sons she should remarry: Helenus or Deiphobus, but she was given to the latter.

During the Fall of Troy 

During the fall of Troy, Helen's role is ambiguous. In Virgil's Aeneid, Deiphobus gives an account of Helen's treacherous stance: when the Trojan Horse was admitted into the city, she feigned Bacchic rites, leading a chorus of Trojan women, and, holding a torch among them, she signaled to the Greeks from the city's central tower. In the Odyssey, however, Homer narrates a different story: Helen circled the Horse three times, and she imitated the voices of the Greek women left behind at home—she thus tortured the men inside (including Odysseus and Menelaus) with the memory of their loved ones, and brought them to the brink of destruction.

After the deaths of Hector and Paris, Helen became the paramour of their younger brother, Deiphobus; but when the sack of Troy began, she hid her new husband's sword, and left him to the mercy of Menelaus and Odysseus. In Aeneid, Aeneas meets the mutilated Deiphobus in Hades; his wounds serve as a testimony to his ignominious end, abetted by Helen's final act of treachery.

However, Helen's portraits in Troy seem to contradict each other. From one side, we read about the treacherous Helen who simulated Bacchic rites and rejoiced over the carnage of Trojans. On the other hand, there is another Helen, lonely and helpless; desperate to find sanctuary, while Troy is on fire. Stesichorus narrates that both Greeks and Trojans gathered to stone her to death. When Menelaus finally found her, he raised his sword to kill her. He had demanded that only he should slay his unfaithful wife; but, when he was ready to do so, she dropped her robe from her shoulders, and the sight of her beauty caused him to let the sword drop from his hand. Electra wails:

Fate 
Helen returned to Sparta and lived with Menelaus, where she was encountered by Telemachus in Book 4 of The Odyssey. As depicted in that account, she and Menelaus were completely reconciled and had a harmonious married life—he holding no grudge at her having run away with a lover and she feeling no restraint in telling anecdotes of her life inside besieged Troy.

According to another version, used by Euripides in his play Orestes, Helen had been saved by Apollo from Orestes and was taken up to Mount Olympus almost immediately after Menelaus' return. A curious fate is recounted by Pausanias the geographer (3.19.11–13), which has Helen share the afterlife with Achilles.

Pausanias also has another story (3.19.9–10): "The account of the Rhodians is different. They say that when Menelaus was dead, and Orestes still a wanderer, Helen was driven out by Nicostratus and Megapenthes and came to Rhodes, where she had a friend in Polyxo, the wife of Tlepolemus. For Polyxo, they say, was an Argive by descent, and when she was already married to Tlepolemus, shared his flight to Rhodes. At the time she was queen of the island, having been left with an orphan boy. They say that this Polyxo desired to avenge the death of Tlepolemus on Helen, now that she had her in her power. So she sent against her when she was bathing handmaidens dressed up as Furies, who seized Helen and hanged her on a tree, and for this reason the Rhodians have a sanctuary of Helen of the Tree." There are other traditions concerning the punishment of Helen. For example, she is offered as a sacrifice to the gods in Tauris by Iphigeneia, or Thetis, enraged when Achilles dies because of Helen, kills her on her return journey.

Tlepolemus was a son of Heracles and Astyoche. Astyoche was a daughter of Phylas, King of Ephyra who was killed by Heracles. Tlepolemus was killed by Sarpedon on the first day of fighting in the Iliad. Nicostratus was a son of Menelaus by his concubine Pieris, an Aetolian slave. Megapenthes was a son of Menelaus by his concubine Tereis, no further origin.

In Euripides's tragedy The Trojan Women, Helen is shunned by the women who survived the war and is to be taken back to Greece to face a death sentence. This version is contradicted by two of Euripides' other tragedies Electra, which predates The Trojan Women, and Helen, as Helen is described as being in Egypt during the events of the Trojan War in each.

Artistic representations 

From Antiquity, depicting Helen would be a remarkable challenge. The story of Zeuxis deals with this exact question: how would an artist immortalize ideal beauty? He eventually selected the best features from five virgins. The ancient world starts to paint Helen's picture or inscribe her form on stone, clay and bronze by the 7th century BC. Dares Phrygius describes Helen in his History of the Fall of Troy: "She was beautiful, ingenuous, and charming. Her legs were the best; her mouth the cutest. There was a beauty-mark between her eyebrows."

Helen is frequently depicted on Athenian vases as being threatened by Menelaus and fleeing from him. This is not the case, however, in Laconic art: on an Archaic stele depicting Helen's recovery after the fall of Troy, Menelaus is armed with a sword but Helen faces him boldly, looking directly into his eyes; and in other works of Peloponnesian art, Helen is shown carrying a wreath, while Menelaus holds his sword aloft vertically. In contrast, on Athenian vases of c. 550–470, Menelaus threateningly points his sword at her.

The abduction by Paris was another popular motif in ancient Greek vase-painting; definitely more popular than the kidnapping by Theseus. In a famous representation by the Athenian vase painter Makron, Helen follows Paris like a bride following a bridegroom, her wrist grasped by Paris' hand. The Etruscans, who had a sophisticated knowledge of Greek mythology, demonstrated a particular interest in the theme of the delivery of Helen's egg, which is depicted in relief mirrors.

In Renaissance painting, Helen's departure from Sparta is usually depicted as a scene of forcible removal (rape) by Paris. This is not, however, the case with certain secular medieval illustrations. Artists of the 1460s and 1470s were influenced by Guido delle Colonne's Historia destructionis Troiae, where Helen's abduction was portrayed as a scene of seduction. In the Florentine Picture Chronicle Paris and Helen are shown departing arm in arm, while their marriage was depicted into Franco-Flemish tapestry.

In Christopher Marlowe's Doctor Faustus (1604), Faust conjures the shade of Helen.  Upon seeing Helen, Faustus speaks the famous line: "Was this the face that launch'd a thousand ships, / And burnt the topless towers of Ilium."  (Act V, Scene I.)  Helen is also conjured by Faust in Goethe's Faust.

In William Shakespeare's play Troilus and Cressida, Helen is a minor character who adores Troilus.

In Pre-Raphaelite art, Helen is often shown with shining curly hair and ringlets. Other painters of the same period depict Helen on the ramparts of Troy, and focus on her expression: her face is expressionless, blank, inscrutable. In Gustave Moreau's painting, Helen will finally become faceless; a blank eidolon in the middle of Troy's ruins.

Cult 

The major centers of Helen's cult were in Laconia. At Sparta, the urban sanctuary of Helen was located near the Platanistas, so called for the plane trees planted there. Ancient sources associate Helen with gymnastic exercises or/and choral dances of maidens near the Evrotas River. This practice is referenced in the closing lines of Lysistrata, where Helen is said to be the "pure and proper" leader of the dancing Spartan women. Theocritus conjures the song epithalamium Spartan women sung at Platanistas commemorating the marriage of Helen and Menelaus:

Helen's worship was also present on the opposite bank of Eurotas at Therapne, where she shared a shrine with Menelaus and the Dioscuri. The shrine has been known as "Menelaion" (the shrine of Menelaus), and it was believed to be the spot where Helen was buried alongside Menelaus. Despite its name, both the shrine and the cult originally belonged to Helen; Menelaus was added later as her husband. In addition, there was a festival at the town, which was called Meneleaeia (Μενελάεια) in honour of Menelaus and Helen.
Isocrates writes that at Therapne Helen and Menelaus were worshiped as gods, and not as heroes. Clader argues that, if indeed Helen was worshiped as a goddess at Therapne, then her powers should be largely concerned with fertility, or as a solar deity. There is also evidence for Helen's cult in Hellenistic Sparta: rules for those sacrificing and holding feasts in their honor are extant.

Helen was also worshiped in Attica along with her brothers, and on Rhodes as Helen Dendritis (Helen of the Trees, Έλένα Δενδρῖτις); she was a vegetation or a fertility goddess. Martin P. Nilsson has argued that the cult in Rhodes has its roots to the Minoan, pre-Greek era, when Helen was allegedly worshiped as a vegetation goddess. Claude Calame and other scholars try to analyze the affinity between the cults of Helen and Artemis Orthia, pointing out the resemblance of the terracotta female figurines offered to both deities.

In popular culture

Pre-modern 

Helen frequently appeared in Athenian comedies of the fifth century BC as a caricature of Pericles's mistress Aspasia. In Hellenistic times, she was associated with the moon due to the similarity of her name to the Greek word Σελήνη (Selēnē), meaning "Moon, goddess of the moon". One Pythagorean source claimed that Helen had originally come from a colony on the moon, where people were larger, stronger, and "fifteen times" more beautiful than ordinary mortals. She is one of the eponymous women the tragedy The Trojan Women produced in 415 BC by the Greek playwright Euripides.

Dio Chrysostom absolved Helen of guilt for the Trojan War by making Paris her first, original husband and claiming that the Greeks started the war out of jealousy. Virgil, in his Aeneid, makes Aeneas the one to spare Helen's life, rather than Menelaus, and instead portrays the act as a lofty example of self-control. Meanwhile, Virgil also makes Helen more vicious by having her betray her own husband Deiphobos and give him over to Menelaus as a peace offering. The satirist Lucian of Samosata features Helen in his famous Dialogues of the Dead, in which he portrays her deceased spirit as aged and withered.

In the early Middle Ages, after the rise of Christianity, Helen was seen as a pagan equivalent to Eve from the Book of Genesis. Helen was so beloved by early medieval Christians that she even took on some of the roles of the Virgin Mary.

Modern 

During the Renaissance, the French poet Pierre de Ronsard wrote 142 sonnets addressed to a woman named Hélène de Surgères, in which he declared her to be the "true", French Helen, rather than the "lie" of the Greeks.

Helen appears in various versions of the Faust myth, including Christopher Marlowe's 1604 play The Tragical History of Doctor Faustus, in which Faustus famously marvels, "Was this the face that launched a thousand ships / And burnt the topless towers of Ilium?" upon seeing a demon impersonating Helen. The line, which is frequently quoted out of context, is a paraphrase of a statement from Lucian's Dialogues of the Dead. It is debated whether the phrase conveys astonishment at Helen's beauty, or disappointment that she is not more beautiful. The German poet and polymath Johann Wolfgang von Goethe re-envisioned the meeting of Faust and Helen.  In Faust: The Second Part of the Tragedy, the union of Helen and Faust becomes a complex allegory of the meeting of the classical-ideal and modern worlds.

In 1803, when French zoologist François Marie Daudin was to name a new species of beautifully colored snake, the trinket snake (Coelognathus helena), he chose the specific name helena in reference to Helen of Troy.

In 1864, Paris saw the premiere of the operetta La belle Hélène by Jacques Offenbach.

Helen of Troy is a minor character in the opera Mefistofele by Arrigo Boito, which received its premiere in Milan in 1868.

In 1881, Oscar Wilde published a poem entitled "The New Helen", in which he declared his friend Lillie Langtry to be the reincarnation of Helen of Troy. Wilde portrays this new Helen as the antithesis of the Virgin Mary, but endows her with the characteristics of Jesus Christ himself. The Irish poet William Butler Yeats compared Helen to his muse, Maude Gonne, in his 1916 poem "No Second Troy". The anthology The Dark Tower by C. S. Lewis includes a fragment entitled "After Ten Years". In Egypt after the Trojan War, Menelaus is allowed to choose between the real, disappointing Helen and an ideal Helen conjured by Egyptian magicians.

The English Pre-Raphaelite painter Evelyn De Morgan portrayed a sexually assertive Helen in her 1898 painting Helen of Troy. Salvador Dalí was obsessed with Helen of Troy from childhood and saw his wife Gala Dalí and the surrealist character Gradiva as the embodiments of Helen. He dedicates his autobiography Diary of a Genius to "my genius Gala Gradiva, Helen of Troy, Saint Helen, Gala Galatea Placida."

Minor planet 101 Helena discovered by James Craig Watson in 1868, is named after Helen of Troy.

John Erskine's 1925 bestselling novel The Private Life of Helen of Troy portrayed Helen as a "sensible, bourgeois heroine", but the 1927 silent film of the same name, directed by Alexander Korda, transformed Helen into "a shopaholic fashion maven".

In 1928, Richard Strauss wrote the German opera Die ägyptische Helena (The Egyptian Helena), which is the story of Helen and Menelaus's troubles when they are marooned on a mythical island.

The 1938 short story, "Helen O'Loy", written by Lester del Rey, details the creation of a synthetic woman by two mechanics. The title is wordplay that combines "Helen of Troy" with "alloy".

The 1951 Swedish film Sköna Helena is an adapted version of Offenbach's operetta, starring Max Hansen and Eva Dahlbeck In 1956, a Franco-British epic titled Helen of Troy was released, directed by Oscar-winning director Robert Wise and starring Italian actress Rossana Podestà in the title role. It was filmed in Italy, and featured well-known British character actors such as Harry Andrews, Cedric Hardwicke, and Torin Thatcher in supporting roles.

The 1971 film The Trojan Women was an adaptation of the play by Euripides in which Irene Papas portrayed (a non-blonde) Helen of Troy.

In the 1998 TV series Hercules, Helen appears as a supporting character at Prometheus Academy as a student. Helen is caring and enthusiastic. She was the most popular girl in the academy and Adonis' girlfriend. Helen tries her best to keep Adonis from behaving stupidly, but mostly fails. She likes Hercules, but as a friend. She is a princess as in the myth but is not a half-sister of Hercules in the series. She was voiced by Jodi Benson.

A 2003 television version of Helen's life up to the fall of Troy, Helen of Troy, in which she was played by Sienna Guillory. In this version, Helen is depicted as unhappy in her marriage and willingly runs away with Paris, with whom she has fallen in love, but still returns to Menelaus after Paris dies and Troy falls. 

Helen was portrayed by Diane Kruger in the 2004 film Troy. In this adaptation, as in the 2003 television version, she is unhappily married to Menelaus and willingly leaves with Paris, whom she loves. However, in this version she does not return to Sparta with Menelaus (who is killed by Hector), but escapes Troy with Paris and other survivors when the city falls. 

Jacob M. Appel's 2008 play, Helen of Sparta, retells Homer's Iliad from Helen's point of view.

Inspired by the line, "Was this the face that launched a thousand ships...?" from Marlowe's Faustus, Isaac Asimov jocularly coined the unit "millihelen" to mean the amount of beauty that can launch one ship. Canadian novelist and poet Margaret Atwood re-envisioned the myth of Helen in modern, feminist guise in her poem "Helen of Troy Does Countertop Dancing".

In the Legends of Tomorrow episode "Helen Hunt", Helen is portrayed by Israeli-American model and actress Bar Paly. In the episode, Helen is an anachronism appearing in 1930s Hollywood. She lands a job as an actress and unintentionally starts a war between two film studios. The Legends travel to the 1930s and try to get Helen back to the Bronze Age. She regretfully goes along, telling the team she wishes to stay away. After analyzing historical records of her impact on history, Zari Tomaz finds the best time to take her away from the fighting of her time and takes her to Themyscira. Helen reappears in the season three finale, "The Good, the Bad and the Cuddly", as an Amazon warrior who assists the Legends in defeating the demon Mallus's army.

In the 2018 TV miniseries Troy: Fall of a City, Helen was portrayed by Bella Dayne.

Pop singer-songwriter Al Stewart released a song called "Helen and Cassandra" on the reissue of his 1988 album Last Days of the Century.  In it he addresses many aspects of the Helen myth and contrasts her with the seer Cassandra.

Indie pop singer Lorde released a song called “Helen of Troy” for the deluxe version of her 2021 album Solar Power.

See also 
 Astyanassa
 Simon Magus and Helen

Notes

References

Additional references

Primary sources 

 Aristophanes, Lysistrata. For an English translation see the Perseus Project.
 Cicero, De inventione II.1.1–2
 Cypria, fragments 1, 9, and 10. For an English translation see the Medieval and Classical Literature Library.
 Dio Chrysostom, Discourses. For an English translation, see Lacus Curtius.
 Euripides, Helen. For an English translation, see the Perseus Project.
 Euripides, Iphigenia in Aulis. For an English translation, see the Perseus project.
 Euripides, Orestes. For an English translation, see the Perseus Project.
 Herodotus, Histories, Book II. For an English translation, see the Perseus Project.
 Hesiod, Catalogs of Women and Eoiae. For an English translation see the Medieval and Classical Literature Library.
 Homer, Iliad, Book III; Odyssey, Books IV, and XXIII.
 Hyginus, Fables.  Translated in English by Mary Grant.
 Isocrates, Helen. For an English translation, see the Perseus Project.
 Servius, In Aeneida I.526, XI.262
 Lactantius Placidus, Commentarii in Statii Thebaida I.21.
 Little Iliad, fragment 13. For an English translation, see the Medieval and Classical Literature Library.
 Ovid, Heroides, XVI.Paris Helenae. For an English translation, see the Perseus Project.
 Pausanias, Description of Greece, Book III. For an English translation, see the Perseus Project.
 Pseudo-Apollodorus, Bibliotheca, Book III; Epitome.
 Sappho, fragment 16.
 Sextus Propertius, Elegies, 3.14. Translated in English by A.S. Kline.
 Theocritus, Idylls, XVIII (The Epithalamium of Helen). Translated in English by J. M. Edmonds.
 Virgil, Aeneid. Book VI. For an English translation see the Perseus Project.

Secondary sources 

 Rozokoki, Alexandra. "The Significance of the Ancestry and Eastern Origins of Helen of Sparta". Quaderni Urbinati Di Cultura Classica, New Series, 98, no. 2 (2011): 35–69. http://www.jstor.org/stable/23048961.

External links 

An analysis of the legend including historical evidence of worship as a goddess.

Solar goddesses
Princesses in Greek mythology
Queens in Greek mythology
Children of Zeus
Women of the Trojan war
People of the Trojan War
Characters in the Odyssey
Kidnapped people
Mythological rape victims
Laconian mythology
 
Greek goddesses
Deeds of Aphrodite
Divine twins
Deeds of Hermes